Rostami (also Romanized as Rostamī; also known as Rostamī Jān, Rustaini, and Rustami) is a village in Delvar Rural District, Delvar District, Tangestan County, Bushehr Province, Iran. At the 2006 census, its population was 153, in 38 families.

References 

Populated places in Tangestan County